The Cape au Moine (1,941 m) is a mountain of the Swiss Prealps, located on the border between the cantons of Vaud and Fribourg. It lies north of the Col de Jaman and south of the Col de Soladier, among of a crest of peaks extending roughly north into Fribourg to the Dent de Lys, on the range between Lake Geneva and the valley of Gruyère.

References

External links
 Cape au Moine on Hikr

Mountains of the Alps
Mountains of Switzerland
Mountains of the canton of Fribourg
Mountains of the canton of Vaud
Fribourg–Vaud border
One-thousanders of Switzerland